2-Aminoisobutyric acid (also known as α-aminoisobutyric acid, AIB, α-methylalanine, or 2-methylalanine) is the non-proteinogenic amino acid with the structural formula H2N-C(CH3)2-COOH. It is rare in nature, having been only found in meteorites, and some antibiotics of fungal origin, such as alamethicin and some lantibiotics.

Synthesis
In the laboratory, 2-aminoisobutyric acid may be prepared from acetone cyanohydrin, by reaction with ammonia followed by hydrolysis.
Industrial scale synthesis can be achieved by the selective hydroamination of methacrylic acid.

Biological activity
2-Aminoisobutyric acid is not one of the proteinogenic amino acids and is rather rare in nature (cf. non-proteinogenic amino acids). It is a strong helix inducer in peptides due to Thorpe–Ingold effect of its gem-dimethyl group. Oligomers of AIB form 310 helices.

Ribosomal incorporation into peptides 

2-Aminoisobutyric acid is compatible with ribosomal elongation of peptide synthesis. Katoh et al. used flexizymes and an engineered a tRNA body to enhance the affinity of aminoacylated AIB-tRNA species to elongation factor P. The result was an increased incorporation of AIB into peptides in a cell free translation system. Iqbal et al.. used an alternative approach of creating an editing deficient valine—tRNA ligase to synthesize aminoacylated AIB-tRNAVal. The aminoacylated tRNA was subsequently used in a cell-free translation system to yield AIB-containing peptides.

References

Branched-chain amino acids
Amino acids
Non-proteinogenic amino acids